Giannis Tsolakidis (born 26 January 1996) is a Greek professional footballer who plays as a right winger for Panserraikos.

Club career
On January 2, 2017, it was announced that Tsolakidis signed a six-month loan deal with Aiginiakos. He left the club in the summer 2019. 
On 24 September 2019, Tsolakidis signed with Edessaikos.

References

External links

1996 births
Living people
Greek footballers
Greek expatriate footballers
Greece youth international footballers
Super League Greece players
Cypriot First Division players
PAOK FC players
Karmiotissa FC players
Panelefsiniakos F.C. players
Edessaikos F.C. players
Expatriate footballers in Cyprus
Greek expatriate sportspeople in Cyprus
Association football wingers
Footballers from Giannitsa